Old Milwaukee is a brand of American dry lager owned by the Pabst Brewing Company and consists of four different brews—Old Milwaukee Lager, Old Milwaukee Light, Old Milwaukee Non-Alcoholic, and Old Milwaukee Ice. Old Milwaukee is brewed throughout the USA and various packages are currently distributed in all 50 US states, many Canadian provinces, and in select international markets.

History
Old Milwaukee Beer was first brewed in the 1930s as a value-priced beer by the Joseph Schlitz Brewing Company. In 1982, the Schlitz Brewing Company and the Old Milwaukee brand were acquired by Stroh Brewery Company of Detroit. In 2000, Stroh's and all of its beer brands and recipes were acquired by Pabst Brewing Company, where the brand currently resides.

Canada is one exception: in 1999, Sleeman Breweries of Guelph, Ontario (a division of Sapporo Breweries) acquired Stroh Canada, becoming the Canadian manufacturer and distributor of Old Milwaukee. The purchase doubled Sleeman's volumes, although the Old Milwaukee brand competes on lower margins than premium beers.

In 1987 Old Milwaukee introduced a beer/party ball to the market. It contains five gallons of beer.  The "Beer Ball" was first introduced by F. X. Matt (at the time called the West End Brewing Co.) of Utica, New York, and that brewer coined the name "Beer Ball".  Matt's first Beer Ball hit the market in 1977 and by 1982 it was being used by 10 other US and Canadian breweries.

Accolades 
All four Old Milwaukee brews have won top honors at the Great American Beer Festival and the World Beer Cup.

Old Milwaukee Light was awarded the Gold medal in the category American-Style Light Lager at the 2008 World Beer Cup.

All four brews have won numerous awards at the Great American Brew Festival including:

Old Milwaukee Lager 
 1997 GABF – American-Style Lager – Bronze
 1998 GABF – American-Style Lager – Silver
 1999 GABF – American-Style Lager – Gold
 2003 GABF – American Style Lager – Gold
 2004 GABF – American Style Lager – Gold
 2010 GABF – American Style Lager – Silver

Old Milwaukee Light: 
 1997 GABF – American-Style Light Lager – Gold
 1999 GABF – American-Style Light Lager – Gold
 2003 GABF – American-Style Light Lager – Bronze
 2004 GABF – American Style Light Lager – Silver
 2005 GABF – American Style Light Lager – Gold
 2006 GABF – American Style Light Lager – Gold
 2007 GABF – American Style Light Lager – Gold
 2008 GABF – American Style Light Lager – Silver
 2011 GABF – American Style Light Lager – Gold

Old Milwaukee NA: 
 1995 GABF Non-Alcoholic Malt Beverage – Bronze
 1999 GABF – Non-Alcoholic Malt Beverage – Gold
 2002 GABF – Non-Alcoholic Malt Beverage – Silver
 2004 GABF – Non-Alcoholic Malt Beverage – Gold

Old Milwaukee Ice: 
 2001 GABF – American-Style Specialty Lager – Silver

Advertising
In 1991, Old Milwaukee ran TV ads featuring the fictional "Swedish Bikini Team".

In 2013, Will Ferrell recorded a series of ads for the company.

In 2014, Old Milwaukee teamed up with the Packard Brothers to create the Pass Me a Beer series. The latest release features Nick Packard and Tim Higgins completing challenging and comedic beer tosses for the Pass Me a Beer Summer Finale.

Alcohol content/nutritional value

References

External links
 Official Website

American beer brands
Pabst Brewing Company